UJM may refer to:

Union of Journalists of Moldova
Universal Japanese Motorcycle, a motorcycle style
Maoist Youth Union, Spain